The 1982 South Australian state election was held on 6 November 1982.

Retiring Members

Labor
Des Corcoran MHA (Hartley)
Gil Langley MHA (Unley)

Liberal
Keith Russack MHA (Goyder)
John Carnie MLC
Boyd Dawkins MLC
Don Laidlaw MLC

House of Assembly
Sitting members are shown in bold text. Successful candidates are highlighted in the relevant colour. Where there is possible confusion, an asterisk (*) is also used.

Legislative Council
Sitting members are shown in bold text. Tickets that elected at least one MLC are highlighted in the relevant colour. Successful candidates are identified by an asterisk (*). Eleven seats were up for election. The Labor Party was defending six seats, although sitting MLC Norm Foster was running as an independent. The Liberal Party was defending five seats.

References

Candidates for South Australian state elections
1982 elections in Australia
1980s in South Australia